This is a list of destinations served or previously served by JetBlue . The American low-cost airline operates a fleet of Airbus and Embraer aircraft throughout the United States, northern and central Latin America, the Caribbean, as well as Europe, with most of its operations within the eastern United States.

Top domestic markets

Destinations

References

Lists of airline destinations
destinations